Oecotraustes is an extinct cephalopod genus included in the ammonid family Oppeliidae and named by Waagen in 1869. The genus lived during the Middle Jurassic.

Description
The shell of Oecotraustes is evolute, the outer whorl only moderately embracing the inner whorls, laterally compressed whorl height greater than width. Outer flanks and venter ribbed, ribs sinuous.

Distribution
Fossils of Oecotraustes species have been found in Jurassic sediments of Germany, India, Madagascar, Spain, and the United States.

References

W.J. Arkell et al., 1957. Mesozoic Ammonoidea; Treatise on Invertebrate Paleontology, Part L, Ammonoidea. Geological Society of America.

Jurassic ammonites
Ammonites of Europe
Ammonites of North America